This is a list of museums in the State of Palestine:

Bethlehem 
 Al Bad Museum for Olive Oil Production, Bethlehem
 Baituna al-Talhami Museum, Bethlehem
 Palestine Museum of Natural History, Bethlehem
 Riwaya Museum - Manger Square, Bethlehem

Birzeit 

 The Palestinian Museum, Birzeit
 Birzeit University Museum

Gaza Strip 

 Al Mat'haf – Gaza Museum of Archaeology, Gaza City
 Qasr al-Basha (Pasha's Palace Museum), Gaza City 
 Al Qarara Cultural Museum 
 Yasser Arafat Foundation – Gaza Office

Hebron 

 Hebron University Museum
 Old Hebron Museum

Jericho 

 Hisham's Palace
 Russian Museum, Jericho

Jerusalem 

 Islamic Museum, Jerusalem
 Abu Jihad Museum, Al-Quds University
 Al-Quds University Science Museum
 Meet Math - Mathematics Museum, Abu Dis
 Palestine Archeological Museum, East Jerusalem
 Armenian Museum, Armenian Quarter, East Jerusalem
 Terra Sancta Museum, Christian Quarter, East Jerusalem

Nablus 

 Samaritans Museum, Mount Gerizim

Qalqilya 

 Education Museum inside Qalqilya Zoo

Ramallah 

 Mahmoud Darwish Museum, Ramallah
 Arafat Museum
 Museum of Palestinian Popular Heritage, Al-Bireh

Tulkarm 

 Al-Mentar Tulkarm Museum
 Tulkarm Archaeological Museum

See also 

 List of museums
 List of libraries in the State of Palestine

References

External links 

 Heritage Centers and Museums in Palestine

Museums
Palestine
Museums
Palestine
Museums